The Vaio AW series is a discontinued range of high-end multimedia laptop computers from Sony introduced in September 2008, replacing the AR Series. They feature an 18.4" 16:9 screen with 1680x945 or LED-backlit 1920x1080 (1080p) screen, NVidia GeForce 9300M GS 256MB or 9600M GT 512MB graphics, Blu-ray drive (Blu-ray burner option), Intel 5100AGN wireless chipset, Core 2 Duo P or T CPUs and a 1.3 megapixel webcam, optional RAID SSD storage (in addition to the hard drive) and HDMI output.

The AW weighs 3.7kg/8.2lbs.

External links
Product info

AW